Karim Mossaoui (born 27 February 1988 in Rotterdam) is a Dutch footballer who plays as a midfielder. He is currently plays for Indonesian Pro Futsal League club Bintang Timur Surabaya.

Career
Mossaoui started his career at Excelsior, a team he has been part of since childhood, making 35 appearances with one lone goal during the 2008–09 and 2009–10 seasons, but no appearance at all in the club's 2010–11 Eredivisie campaign. He was consequently loaned out to Eerste Divisie club Fortuna Sittard on 31 January 2011.

References

External links
 Karim Mossaoui at Voetbal International 

1988 births
Living people
Dutch footballers
Dutch men's futsal players
Excelsior Rotterdam players
Fortuna Sittard players
FC Etar 1924 Veliko Tarnovo players
Helmond Sport players
Eredivisie players
Eerste Divisie players
Footballers from Rotterdam
Dutch sportspeople of Moroccan descent
Expatriate footballers in Bulgaria
Association football midfielders